Malli Sethi is a gramm panchayat on the banks of the Kosi River in the Betalghat Tehsil of Nainital district in Uttarakhand, India. It is located about 5 km from Betalghat.
Nowadays, the village is most noted for the Malli Sethi bridge over the Kosi River.
There are a few small villages in this gramm panchayat named Sethi Bhandar, Sethi Belgaun, Sethi Dharkot, Kotadhiriya, Khadki, Chandpur, and Khola.
All the above villages are rich in land for farming. Most of the villagers are involved in agriculture, the Kosi River is a life line for them.
Bhumiya bubu Mandir (Temple of god of village) is situated at the top of Sethi Bhandar. Dhuni are also there in all the villages. The Kali mata Mandir, and the Shivalay are also there.
There is a primary school and junior high school.
The village is well connected with block headquarters Betalghat via road.
Belwal's family is known as Landlord (jamidar) in the entire region,
Lat Shri Hira Belwal was a freedom fighter who was imprisoned for one year in Nainital jail (before independence). After gaining independence from England, his family got a TamraPatra (memorabilia) and a certificate from contemporaneous prime minister Shrimati Indira Gandhi.

Villages in Nainital district